Death metal is an extreme subgenre of heavy metal music. It typically employs heavily distorted and low-tuned guitars, played with techniques such as palm muting and tremolo picking; deep growling vocals; aggressive, powerful drumming, featuring double kick and blast beat techniques; minor keys or atonality; abrupt tempo, key, and time signature changes; and chromatic chord progressions. The lyrical themes of death metal may include slasher film-style violence, political conflict, religion, nature, philosophy, true crime and science fiction.

Building from the musical structure of thrash metal and early black metal, death metal emerged during the mid-1980s. Bands such as Venom, Celtic Frost, Slayer, and Kreator were important influences on the genre's creation. Possessed, Death, Necrophagia, Obituary, Autopsy, and Morbid Angel are often considered pioneers of the genre. In the late 1980s and early 1990s, death metal gained more media attention as a popular genre. Niche record labels like Combat, Earache, and Roadrunner began to sign death metal bands at a rapid rate.

Since then, death metal has diversified, spawning several subgenres. Melodic death metal combines death metal elements with those of the new wave of British heavy metal. Technical death metal is a complex style, with uncommon time signatures, atypical rhythms, and unusual harmonies and melodies. Death-doom combines the deep growled vocals and double-kick drumming of death metal with the slow tempos and melancholic atmosphere of doom metal. Deathgrind, goregrind, and pornogrind mix the complexity of death metal with the intensity, speed, and brevity of grindcore. Deathcore combines death metal with metalcore traits. Death 'n' roll combines death metal's growled vocals and highly distorted, detuned guitar riffs with elements of 1970s hard rock and heavy metal.

History

Emergence and early history

English extreme metal band Venom, from Newcastle, crystallized the elements of what later became known as thrash metal, death metal and black metal, with their first two albums Welcome to Hell and Black Metal, released in late 1981 and 1982, respectively. Their dark, blistering sound, harsh vocals, and macabre, proudly Satanic imagery proved a major inspiration for extreme metal bands. Another highly influential band, Slayer, formed in 1981. Although the band was a thrash metal act, Slayer's music was more violent than their thrash contemporaries Metallica, Megadeth, and Anthrax. Their breakneck speed and instrumental prowess combined with lyrics about death, violence, war, and Satanism won Slayer a cult following. According to Mike McPadden, Hell Awaits, Slayer's second album, "largely invent[ed] much of the sound and fury that would evolve into death metal." According to AllMusic, their third album Reign in Blood inspired the entire death metal genre. It had a big impact on genre leaders such as Death, Obituary, and Morbid Angel.

Possessed, a band that formed in the San Francisco Bay Area during 1983, is described by Allmusic as "connecting the dots" between thrash metal and death metal with their 1985 debut album, Seven Churches. While attributed as having a Slayer influence, current and former members of the band had actually cited Venom and Motörhead, as well as early work by Exodus, as the main influences on their sound. Although the group had released only two studio albums and an EP in their formative years, they have been described by music journalists and musicians as either being "monumental" in developing the death metal style, or as being the first death metal band. Earache Records noted that "the likes of Trey Azagthoth and Morbid Angel based what they were doing in their formative years on the Possessed blueprint laid down on the legendary Seven Churches recording. Possessed arguably did more to further the cause of 'Death Metal' than any of the early acts on the scene back in the mid-late 80's."

During the same period as the dawn of Possessed, a second influential metal band was formed in Orlando, Florida. Originally called Mantas, Death was formed in 1983 by Chuck Schuldiner, Kam Lee, and Rick Rozz. Inspired by the Brandon, Florida act Nasty Savage, they took the sound of Nasty Savage and deepened it. In 1984, they released their first demo entitled Death by Metal, followed by several more. The tapes circulated through the tape trader world, quickly establishing the band's name. With Death guitarist Schuldiner adopting vocal duties, the band made a major impact in the emerging Florida death metal scene. The fast minor-key riffs and solos were complemented with fast drumming, creating a style that would catch on in tape trading circles. Schuldiner has been credited by Allmusic's Eduardo Rivadavia for being widely recognized as the "Father of Death Metal". Death's 1987 debut release, Scream Bloody Gore, has been described by About.com's Chad Bowar as being the "evolution from thrash metal to death metal", and "the first true death metal record" by the San Francisco Chronicle. In an Interview Jeff Becerra talked about the discussions of being the creator of the genre, saying that Schuldiner cited Possessed as a massive influence, and Death were even called "Possessed clones" early on. Along with Possessed and Death, other pioneers of death metal in the United States include Macabre, Master, Massacre, Immolation, Cannibal Corpse, Obituary, and Post Mortem.

Growing popularity
By 1989, many bands had been signed by eager record labels wanting to cash in on the subgenre, including Florida's Obituary, Morbid Angel and Deicide. This collective of death metal bands hailing from Florida are often labeled as "Florida death metal". Morbid Angel pushed the genre's limits both musically and lyrically, with the release of their debut album Altars of Madness in 1989. The album "redefined what it meant to be heavy while influencing an upcoming class of brutal death metal."

Death metal spread to Sweden in the late 1980s, flourishing with pioneers such as Carnage, God Macabre, Entombed, Dismember, Grave and Unleashed. In the early 1990s, the rise of melodic death metal was recognized, with Swedish bands such as Dark Tranquillity, At the Gates, and In Flames.

Following the original death metal innovators, new subgenres began by the end of the decade. British band Napalm Death became increasingly associated with death metal, in particular, on their 1990 album Harmony Corruption. This album displays aggressive and fairly technical guitar riffing, complex rhythmics, a sophisticated growling vocal delivery by Mark "Barney" Greenway, and socially aware lyrical subjects merging death metal with the grindcore subgenre. Other bands contributing significantly to this early movement include Britain's Bolt Thrower and Carcass and New York's Suffocation.

To close the circle, Death released their fourth album Human in 1991. Death's founder Schuldiner helped push the boundaries of uncompromising speed and technical virtuosity, mixing technical and intricate rhythm guitar work with complex arrangements and emotive guitar solos.

Earache Records, Relativity Records and Roadrunner Records became the genre's most important labels, with Earache releasing albums by Carcass, Napalm Death, Morbid Angel, and Entombed, and Roadrunner releasing albums by Obituary, and Pestilence. Although these labels had not been death metal labels, they initially became the genre's flagship labels at the beginning of the 1990s. In addition to these, other labels formed as well, such as Nuclear Blast, Century Media, and Peaceville. Many of these labels would go on to achieve successes in other genres of metal throughout the 1990s.

In September 1990, Death's manager Eric Greif held one of the first North American death metal festivals, Day of Death, in Milwaukee suburb Waukesha, Wisconsin, and featured 26 bands including Autopsy, Broken Hope, Hellwitch, Obliveon, Revenant, Viogression, Immolation, Atheist, and Cynic.

Later history
Death metal's popularity achieved its initial peak during 1992–1993, with some bands such as Morbid Angel and Cannibal Corpse enjoying mild commercial success. However, the genre as a whole never broke into the mainstream. The genre's mounting popularity may have been partly responsible for a strong rivalry between Norwegian black metal and Swedish death metal scenes. Fenriz of Darkthrone has noted that Norwegian black metal musicians were "fed up with the whole death metal scene" at the time. Death metal diversified in the 1990s, spawning a rich variety of subgenres that still have a large "underground" following at the present.

Characteristics

Instrumentation

The setup most frequently used within the death metal genre is two guitarists, a bass player, a vocalist, and a drummer often using "hyper double-bass blast beats". Although this is the standard setup, bands have been known to occasionally incorporate other instruments such as electronic keyboards. The genre is often identified by fast, heavily distorted and low tuned guitars, played with techniques such as palm muting and tremolo picking. The percussion is usually aggressive and powerful.

Death metal is known for its abrupt tempo, key, and time signature changes. It may include chromatic chord progressions and a varied song structure. In some circumstances, the style will incorporate melodic riffs and harmonies for effect. This incorporation of melody and harmonious playing was even further used in the creation of melodic death metal. These compositions tend to emphasize an ongoing development of themes and motifs.

Vocals and lyrics

Death metal vocals are referred to as death growls; hoarse roars/snarls. Death growling is mistakenly thought to be a form of screaming using the lowest vocal register known as vocal fry, however vocal fry is actually a form of overtone screaming, and while growling can be performed this way by experienced vocalists who use the fry screaming technique, "true" death growling is in fact created by an altogether different technique. The three major methods of harsh vocalization used in the genre are often mistaken for each other, encompassing vocal fry screaming, false chord screaming, and "true" death growls. Growling is sometimes also referred to as Cookie Monster vocals, tongue-in-cheek, due to the vocal similarity to the voice of the popular Sesame Street character of the same name. Although often criticized, death growls serve the aesthetic purpose of matching death metal's aggressive lyrical content. High-pitched screaming is occasionally utilized in death metal, being heard in songs by Death, Aborted, Exhumed, Dying Fetus, Cannibal Corpse, and Deicide.

The lyrical themes of death metal may invoke slasher film-stylised violence, but may also extend to topics like religion (sometimes including Satanism), occultism, Lovecraftian horror, nature, mysticism, mythology, theology, philosophy, science fiction, and politics. Although violence may be explored in various other genres as well, death metal may elaborate on the details of extreme acts, including blood and gore, psychopathy, delirium, mutilation, mutation, dissection, exorcism, torture, rape, cannibalism, and necrophilia. Sociologist Keith Kahn-Harris commented this apparent glamorisation of violence may be attributed to a "fascination" with the human body that all people share to some degree, a fascination that mixes desire and disgust. Heavy metal author Gavin Baddeley also stated there does seem to be a connection between "how acquainted one is with their own mortality" and "how much they crave images of death and violence" via the media. Additionally, contributing artists to the genre often defend death metal as little more than an extreme form of art and entertainment, similar to horror films in the motion picture industry. This explanation has brought such musicians under fire from activists internationally, who claim that this is often lost on a large number of adolescents, who are left with the glamorisation of such violence without social context or awareness of why such imagery is stimulating.

According to Alex Webster, bassist of Cannibal Corpse, "The gory lyrics are probably not, as much as people say, [what's keeping us] from being mainstream. Like, 'death metal would never go into the mainstream because the lyrics are too gory?' I think it's really the music, because violent entertainment is totally mainstream."

Etymology
The most popular theory of the subgenre's christening is Possessed's 1984 demo, Death Metal; the song from the eponymous demo would also be featured on the band's 1985 debut album, Seven Churches. Possessed vocalist/bassist Jeff Becerra said he coined the term in early 1983 for a high school English class assignment. Another possible origin was a magazine called Death Metal, started by Thomas Fischer and Martin Ain of Hellhammer and Celtic Frost. The name was later given to the 1984 compilation Death Metal released by Noise Records. The term might also have originated from other recordings, such as the demo released by Death in 1984, called Death by Metal.

Subgenres and fusion genres

Cited examples are not necessarily exclusive to one particular style. Many bands can easily be placed in two or more of the following categories, and a band's specific categorization is often a source of contention due to personal opinion and interpretation.

Blackened death-doom
Blackened death-doom is a microgenre that combines the slow tempos and monolithic drumming of doom metal, the complex and loud riffage of death metal and the shrieking vocals of black metal. Examples of blackened death-doom bands include Morast, Faustcoven, The Ruins of Beverast, Bölzer, Necros Christos, Harvest Gulgaltha, Dragged into Sunlight, Hands of Thieves, and Soulburn.

Blackened death metal

Blackened death metal is commonly death metal that incorporates musical, lyrical or ideological elements of black metal, such as an increased use of tremolo picking, anti-Christian or Satanic lyrical themes and chord progressions similar to those used in black metal. Blackened death metal bands are also more likely to wear corpse paint and suits of armour, than bands from other styles of death metal. Lower range guitar tunings, death growls and abrupt tempo changes are common in the genre. Examples of blackened death metal bands are Belphegor, Behemoth, Akercocke, and Sacramentum.

Melodic black-death
Melodic black-death (also known as blackened melodic death metal or melodic blackened death metal) is a genre of extreme metal that describes the style created when melodic death metal bands began being inspired by black metal and European romanticism. However, unlike most other black metal, this take on the genre would incorporate an increased sense of melody and narrative. Some bands who have played this style include Dissection, Sacramentum, Embraced, Naglfar, Satariel, Throes of Dawn, Obscurity, Dawn, Cries of the Past-era Underoath, Catamenia, Midvinter, Twin Obscenity, Nokturnal Mortum Unanimated, Epoch of Unlight, This Ending, Suidakra, Oathean, Thulcandra, Skeletonwitch, and Cardinal Sin.

War metal
War metal (also known as war black metal or bestial black metal) is an aggressive, cacophonous and chaotic subgenre of blackened death metal, described by Rock Hard journalist Wolf-Rüdiger Mühlmann as "rabid" and "hammering". Important influences include first wave black metal band Sodom, first wave black metal/death metal band Possessed as well as old grindcore, black and death metal bands like Repulsion, Autopsy, Sarcófago and the first two Sepultura releases. War metal bands include Blasphemy, Archgoat, Impiety, In Battle, Beherit, Crimson Thorn, Bestial Warlust, and Zyklon-B.

Brutal death metal 
Brutal death metal is a subgenre of death metal that privileges heaviness, speed, and complex rhythms over other aspects, such as melody and timbres. Brutal death metal bands employ high-speed, palm-muted power chording and single-note riffage. Notable bands include Cannibal Corpse, Dying Fetus, Suffocation, Cryptopsy and Skinless.

Death-doom

Death-doom is a style that combines the slow tempos and pessimistic atmosphere of doom metal with the deep growling vocals and double-kick drumming of death metal. Influenced mostly by the early work of Hellhammer and Celtic Frost, the style emerged during the late 1980s and gained a certain amount of popularity during the 1990s. Death-doom was also pioneered by bands such as Winter, Disembowelment, Paradise Lost, Autopsy, Anathema, and My Dying Bride.

Funeral doom
Funeral doom is a genre that crosses death-doom with funeral dirge music. It is played at a very slow tempo, and places an emphasis on evoking a sense of emptiness and despair. Typically, electric guitars are heavily distorted and dark ambient aspects such as keyboards or synthesizers are often used to create a dreamlike atmosphere. Vocals consist of mournful chants or growls and are often in the background. Funeral doom was pioneered by Mournful Congregation (Australia), Esoteric (United Kingdom), Evoken (United States), Funeral (Norway), Thergothon (Finland), and Skepticism (Finland).

Death 'n' roll

Death 'n' roll is a style that combines death metal's growled vocals and highly distorted detuned guitar riffs along with elements of 1970s hard rock and heavy metal. Notable examples include Entombed, Gorefest, and Six Feet Under.

Deathcore

With the rise in popularity of metalcore, some of its traits have been combined with death metal. Bands such as Suicide Silence, Carnifex and Salt the Wound combine death metal with a variance of metalcore elements. Characteristics of death metal, such as fast drumming (including blast beats), down-tuned guitars, tremolo picking, growled vocals, and high-pitched shrieks are combined with the breakdowns of metalcore. Decibel magazine stated that "one of Suffocation's trademarks, breakdowns, has spawned an entire metal subgenre: deathcore."

Deathgrind, goregrind and pornogrind

Goregrind, deathgrind and pornogrind are styles that mix grindcore with death metal, with goregrind focused on themes like gore and forensic pathology, and pornogrind dealing with sexual and pornographic themes. Some notable examples of these genres are Brujeria, Cattle Decapitation, Cephalic Carnage, Pig Destroyer, Circle of Dead Children, Rotten Sound, Gut, and Cock and Ball Torture.

Deathrash
Deathrash, also known as death-thrash, is a shorthand term to describe bands who play a fusion of death metal and thrash metal. The genre gained notoriety in Bali, Indonesia, where it attracted criticism of being related to the accelerated tourism development on the island and the superseding of its local culture, particularly by Jakartan one. Notable bands include Grave, Mortification, The Crown, Incapacity, Darkane, Deathchain, and Sepultura.

Industrial death metal
Industrial death metal is a genre of death metal that adds elements of industrial music. Some notable bands include Fear Factory, Anaal Nathrakh, Autokrator, and Meathook Seed.

Melodic death metal

Swedish death metal could be considered the forerunner of "melodic death metal." Melodic death metal sometimes referred to as "melodeath", is heavy metal mixed with some death metal elements and is heavily influenced by the new wave of British heavy metal. Unlike most other death metal, melodeath usually features screams instead of growls, slower tempos, much more melody and even clean vocals are heard at rare times. Carcass is sometimes credited with releasing the first melodic death metal album with 1993's Heartwork, although Swedish bands In Flames, Dark Tranquillity, and At the Gates are usually mentioned as the main pioneers of the genre and of the Gothenburg metal sound.

Old school death metal
Old school death metal is a style of death metal characterized by its slower and simpler song structures, less focused on the technical aspects of its composition and employing less usage of blast beats. It gained notoriety in the late 1990s, with bands like Repugnant, Thanatos, Necrophagia, Abscess, Bloodbath and Mortem.

Slam death metal
Slam death metal is a microgenre that evolved from the 1990s New York death metal scene, incorporating elements of hardcore punk. In contrast to other death metal styles, it is not generally focused on guitar solos and blast beats; instead, it employs mid-tempo rhythms, breakdowns, and palm-muted riffing, as well as hip hop-inspired vocal and drum beat rhythms. The breakdown riff of Suffocation's "Liege of Inveracity" has been credited as the first slam riff in death metal. Notable acts include Devourment, Cephalotripsy, and Abominable Putridity.

Symphonic death metal
Symphonic death metal is a genre of death metal that add elements of classical music. Bands described as symphonic death metal include Fleshgod Apocalypse, Septicflesh,  Necronomicon, and Children of Bodom. Haggard's 2000 album, Awaking the Centuries, has been described as death metal-styled symphonic metal.

Technical death metal 

Technical death metal (also known as tech-death, progressive death metal, or prog-death) is a subgenre of death metal that employs dynamic song structures, uncommon time signatures, atypical rhythms and unusual harmonies and melodies. Bands described as technical death metal or progressive death metal usually fuse common death metal aesthetics with elements of progressive rock, jazz or classical music. While the term technical death metal is sometimes used to describe bands that focus on speed and extremity as well as complexity, the line between progressive and technical death metal is thin. Tech death and prog death, for short, are terms commonly applied to such bands as Nile, Edge of Sanity, and Opeth. Necrophagist and Spawn of Possession are known for a classical music-influenced death metal style. Death metal pioneers Death also refined their style in a more progressive direction in their final years. Some albums for this subgenre are Hallucinations (1990) by the German band Atrocity and Death's Human (1991). This style has significantly influenced many bands, creating a stream that in Europe was carried out at first by bands such as Gory Blister and Electrocution. The Polish band Decapitated gained recognition as one of Europe's primary modern technical death metal acts.

See also
List of death metal bands

References

Bibliography

External links

 
1980s in music
1990s in music
20th-century music genres
21st-century music genres
2000s in music
2010s in music
Heavy metal genres
Extreme metal
Obscenity controversies in music
American rock music genres